Coffin corner (also known as the aerodynamic ceiling or Q corner) is the region of flight where a fast but subsonic fixed-wing aircraft's stall speed is near the critical Mach number, at a given gross weight and G-force loading. In this region of flight, it is very difficult to keep an airplane in stable flight. Because the stall speed is the minimum speed required to maintain level flight, any reduction in speed will cause the airplane to stall and lose altitude. Because the critical Mach number is the maximum speed at which air can travel over the wings without losing lift due to flow separation and shock waves, any increase in speed will cause the airplane to lose lift, or to pitch heavily nose-down, and lose altitude. 

The "corner" refers to the triangular shape at the top of a flight envelope chart where the stall speed and critical Mach number are within a few knots of each other. The "coffin" refers to the possible death in these kinds of stalls. The speed where they meet is the ceiling of the aircraft. This is distinct from the same term used for helicopters when outside the auto-rotation envelope as seen in the height-velocity diagram.

Aerodynamic basis
Consideration of statics shows that when a fixed-wing aircraft is in straight, level flight at constant-airspeed, the lift on the main wing plus the force (in the negative sense if downward) on the horizontal stabilizer is equal to the aircraft's weight and its thrust is equal to its drag. In most circumstances this equilibrium can occur at a range of airspeeds. The minimum such speed is the stall speed, or VSO. The indicated airspeed at which a fixed-wing aircraft stalls varies with the weight of the aircraft but does not vary significantly with altitude. At speeds close to the stall speed the aircraft's wings are at a high angle of attack.

At higher altitudes, the air density is lower than at sea level. Because of the progressive reduction in air density, as the aircraft's altitude increases its true airspeed is progressively greater than its indicated airspeed. For example, the indicated airspeed at which an aircraft stalls can be considered constant, but the true airspeed at which it stalls increases with altitude.

Air conducts sound at a certain speed, the "speed of sound". This becomes slower as the air becomes cooler. Because the temperature of the atmosphere generally decreases with altitude (until the tropopause), the speed of sound also decreases with altitude. (See the International Standard Atmosphere for more on temperature as a function of altitude.)

A given airspeed, divided by the speed of sound in that air, gives a ratio known as the Mach number. A Mach number of 1.0 indicates an airspeed equal to the speed of sound in that air. Because the speed of sound increases with air temperature, and air temperature generally decreases with altitude, the true airspeed for a given Mach number generally decreases with altitude.

As an airplane moves through the air faster, the airflow over parts of the wing will reach speeds that approach Mach 1.0.  At such speeds, shock waves form in the air passing over the wings, drastically increasing the drag due to drag divergence, causing Mach buffet, or drastically changing the center of pressure, resulting in a nose-down moment called "mach tuck". The aircraft Mach number at which these effects appear is known as its critical Mach number, or MCRIT. The true airspeed corresponding to the critical Mach number generally decreases with altitude.

The flight envelope is a plot of various curves representing the limits of the aircraft's true airspeed and altitude. Generally, the top-left boundary of the envelope is the curve representing stall speed, which increases as altitude increases.  The top-right boundary of the envelope is the curve representing critical Mach number in true airspeed terms, which decreases as altitude increases. These curves typically intersect at some altitude higher than the maximum permitted altitude for the aircraft. This intersection is the coffin corner, or more formally the Q corner.

The above explanation is based on level, constant speed, flight with a given gross weight and load factor of 1.0 G. The specific altitudes and speeds of the coffin corner will differ depending on weight, and the load factor increases caused by banking and pitching maneuvers. Similarly, the specific altitudes at which the stall speed meets the critical Mach number will differ depending on the actual atmospheric temperature.

Consequences
When an aircraft slows to below its stall speed, it is unable to generate enough lift in order to cancel out the forces that act on the aircraft (such as weight and centripetal force). This will cause the aircraft to drop in altitude. The drop in altitude may cause the pilot to increase the angle of attack by pulling back on the stick, because normally increasing the angle of attack puts the aircraft in a climb. However, when the wing exceeds its critical angle of attack, an increase in angle of attack will lead to a loss of lift and a further loss of airspeed – the wing stalls. The reason why the wing stalls when it exceeds its critical angle of attack is that the airflow over the top of the wing separates.

When the airplane exceeds its critical Mach number (such as during stall prevention or recovery), then drag increases or Mach tuck occurs, which can cause the aircraft to upset, lose control, and lose altitude.  In either case, as the airplane falls, it could gain speed and then structural failure could occur, typically due to excessive g forces during the pullout phase of the recovery.

As an airplane approaches its coffin corner, the margin between stall speed and critical Mach number becomes smaller and smaller. Small changes could put one wing or the other above or below the limits. For instance, a turn causes the inner wing to have a lower airspeed, and the outer wing, a higher airspeed. The aircraft could exceed both limits at once. Or, turbulence could cause the airspeed to change suddenly, to beyond the limits. Some aircraft, such as the Lockheed U-2, routinely operate in the "coffin corner". In the case of the U-2, the aircraft was equipped with an autopilot, though it was unreliable. The U-2's speed margin, at high altitude, between 1-G stall warning buffet and Mach buffet can be as small as 5 knots.

Aircraft capable of flying close to their critical Mach number usually carry a machmeter, an instrument which indicates speed in Mach number terms. As part of certifying aircraft in the United States of America, the Federal Aviation Administration (FAA) certifies a maximum operational velocity in terms of Mach number, or MMO.

Following a series of crashes of high performance aircraft operating at high altitudes to which no definite cause could be attributed, as the aircraft involved suffered near total destruction, the FAA published an Advisory Circular establishing guidelines for improved aircrew training in high altitude operations in high performance aircraft. The circular includes a comprehensive explanation of aerodynamic effects of, and operations near coffin corner.

Due to the effects of greater Mach number at high-altitude flight, the expected flight characteristics of a given configuration can change significantly. This was pointed out by a report describing the effect of ice crystals on pitot-tube airspeed indications at high altitude:

See also
 Height-velocity diagram for helicopters

References

External links
 

Aviation risks
Aerodynamics